Apamea indocilis, the ignorant apamea, is a moth of the family Noctuidae. It is native to North America, where it is distributed throughout southern Canada and the northern United States. In the east its range extends from Newfoundland to South Carolina. In the west it occurs as far south as San Francisco Bay and in the Rocky Mountains to New Mexico.

The forewings are 15 to 19 millimeters long. The moth is generally brown or yellowish tan, but there are three morphs: one lighter mottled tan form and two forms covered with darker markings. The larva is a cutworm that feeds on grasses.

References

External links
Moths of Maryland
Bug Guide

Apamea (moth)
Moths of North America
Moths described in 1856